Lea Ricart Martínez (born 16 January 2001) is an Andorran swimmer. She competed in the women's 50 metre freestyle event at the 2017 World Aquatics Championships.

References

2001 births
Living people
Andorran female swimmers
Place of birth missing (living people)
Andorran female freestyle swimmers